Cupes manifestus is an extinct species of reticulated beetle in the family Cupedidae and the genus Cupes. It is known from Selandian crater lake diatomite in the Menat Formation of France.

References 

Cupedidae